The ANZAC centenary advisory board was established by Department of the Prime Minister and Cabinet of Australia to organise the centenary commemorations of the Australian and jointly New Zealand contribution to the First World War.

Board members

References

External links
100 Years of ANZAC - Australian Government
Anzac Educational Portal

2014 in Australia
2015 in Australia
2016 in Australia
2017 in Australia
2018 in Australia
Intergovernmental organizations
Commonwealth Family
ANZAC